The Neck is a mountain in northwestern British Columbia, Canada, located in Mount Edziza Provincial Park. It is a volcanic feature of the Northern Cordilleran Volcanic Province that formed in the past 1.6 million years of the Pleistocene epoch.

The Neck gets its name for the type of volcanic feature it is called a volcanic plug or a volcanic neck. These volcanic landforms are created when magma hardens within a vent on an active volcano. If a plug is preserved, erosion may remove the surrounding rock while the erosion-resistant plug remains, producing a distinctive landform.

See also
 List of volcanoes in Canada
 List of Northern Cordilleran volcanoes
 Volcanism of Canada
 Volcanism of Western Canada

References

One-thousanders of British Columbia
Mount Edziza volcanic complex
Pleistocene volcanoes
Volcanic plugs of British Columbia